The governor of West Bengal is the nominal head of state of the Indian state of West Bengal and a representative of the president of India. The governor is appointed by the president for a term of five years. His official residence is the Raj Bhavan. C. V. Ananda Bose was appointed as the governor of West Bengal on 23 November 2022.

History
In 1911 the imperial capital of India was moved from Calcutta to Delhi and as some compensation to Bengal the lieutenant governor with council gave place to a governor with a council thus completing the circle and reverting to the position which had been obtained 200 years ago. In 1947 India achieved independence and the title of Governor of Bengal remained.

Powers and functions

The governor enjoys many different types of powers:

Executive powers related to administration, appointments and removals,
Legislative powers related to lawmaking and the state legislature, that is Vidhan Sabha or Vidhan Parishad, and
Discretionary powers to be carried out according to the discretion of the governor.

Ex officio role of governor
In his ex officio capacity, the governor of West Bengal is Chancellor of the universities of West Bengal (at present 16) as per the Acts of the Universities. The Universities are: University of Calcutta; Jadavpur University; Presidency University, Kolkata; University of Kalyani; Rabindra Bharati University; Vidyasagar University; University of Burdwan; North Bengal University; Netaji Subhas Open University; Maulana Abul Kalam Azad University of Technology; Aliah University; Bankura University; Cooch Behar Panchanan Barma University; Diamond Harbour Women's University; University of Gour Banga; Kazi Nazrul University; Raiganj University; Sidho Kanho Birsha University; Sanskrit College and University; West Bengal University of Teachers' Training, Education Planning and Administration;  Uttar Banga Krishi Viswavidyalaya; Bidhan Chandra Krishi Viswa Vidyalaya; West Bengal University of Animal and Fishery Sciences; West Bengal University of Health Sciences and West Bengal State University. For Visva Bharati, the governor is the Pradhana (Rector).

The governor is also the chairman or president of some organizations, such as Victoria Memorial Hall, Indian Museum, Ramakrishna Mission Institute of Culture, Eastern Zonal Cultural Centre, Maulana Abul Kalam Azad Institute of Asian Studies (MAKAIAS), Calcutta Cultural Centre (Kolkata Kala Kendra),  Special Fund for R&R of Ex-servicemen, West Bengal Rajya Sainik Board, Sri Aurobindo Samiti, Indian Red Cross Society - West Bengal State Branch, St. John Ambulance Brigade No. II (West Bengal) District, Bharat Scouts and Guides and the Bengal Tuberculosis Association.

Governor of West Bengal’s Welfare Fund, has the governor as its chairman. Contributions from this fund are given to the needy people for meeting, to some extent the cost of their treatment. Besides the above, at his discretion, the governor, accepts the position of Chief Patron/Patron or other posts in the honorary capacity, in various organizations that are rendering yeoman service to the society in different fields.

List of governors

See also
West Bengal
Governors and Lieutenant-Governors of states of India

References

External links
 Raj Bhavan's (Governor's residence) official website
Constitutional role of Governor
Ex officio role of Governor
   title=Governors of Bengal from 1912 up to the present day

 
Governors
West Bengal